Turtle (also called American Turtle) was the world's first submersible vessel with a documented record of use in combat. It was built in 1775 by American David Bushnell as a means of attaching explosive charges to ships in a harbor, for use against the Royal Navy during the American Revolutionary War. Connecticut Governor Jonathan Trumbull recommended the invention to George Washington, who provided funds and support for the development and testing of the machine.

Several attempts were made using Turtle to affix explosives to the undersides of British warships in New York Harbor in 1776. All failed, and her transport ship was sunk later that year by the British with the submarine aboard. Bushnell claimed eventually to have recovered the machine, but its final fate is unknown.  Modern replicas of Turtle have been constructed and are on display in the Connecticut River Museum, the U.S. Navy's Submarine Force Library and Museum, the Royal Navy Submarine Museum, and the Oceanographic Museum (Monaco).

Development 

The American inventor David Bushnell made the idea of a submersible vessel for use in lifting the British naval blockade during the American War of Independence. Bushnell may have begun studying underwater explosions while at Yale College. By early 1775, he had created a reliable method for detonating underwater explosives,  a clockwork connected to a musket firing mechanism, probably a flintlock, adapted for the purpose.

After the Battles of Lexington and Concord in April 1775, Bushnell began work near Old Saybrook on a small, individually manned submersible designed to attach an explosive charge to the hull of an enemy ship, which, he wrote Benjamin Franklin, would be, "Constructed with Great Simplicity and upon Principles of Natural Philosophy."

Little is known about the origin, inspiration, and influences for Bushnell's invention. It seems clear Bushnell knew of the work of the Dutch inventor Cornelius Drebbel.  According to Dr. Benjamin Gale, a doctor who taught at Yale, the many brass and mechanical (moving) parts of the submarine were built by the New Haven clock-maker, engraver, silversmith, brass manufacturer and inventor Isaac Doolittle, whose shop was just a half block from Yale. 

Though Bushnell is given the overall design credit for the Turtle by Gale and others, Doolittle was well known as an "ingenious mechanic" (i.e. an engineer), engraver, and metalworker. He had both designed and manufactured complicated brass-wheel hall-clocks, a mahogany printing-press in 1769 (the first made in America, after Doolittle successfully duplicated the iron screw), brass compasses, and surveying instruments. He also founded and owned a brass foundry where he cast bells. At the start of the American Revolution,the wealthy and patriotic Doolittle built a gunpowder mill with two partners in New Haven to support the war, and was sent by the Connecticut government to prospect for lead.

Though the design of the Turtle was necessarily shrouded in secrecy, based on his mechanical engineering expertise and previous experience in design and manufacturing, it seems Doolittle designed and crafted (and probably funded) the brass and the moving parts of the Turtle, including the propulsion system, the navigation instruments, the brass foot-operated water-ballast and forcing pumps, the depth gauge and compass, the brass crown hatch, the clockwork detonator for the mine, and the hand-operated propeller crank and foot-driven treadle with flywheel. 

According to a letter from Dr. Benjamin Gale to Benjamin Franklin, Doolittle also designed the mine attachment mechanism, "those Parts which Conveys the Powder, and secures the same to the Bottom of the Ship". 

As it was probably brass, it was thus likely designed and forged by Doolittle.

Doolittle also likely provided the scarce commodities of gunpowder and lead ballast as well. The wealthy Doolittle, nearly 20 years older than the Yale student Bushnell, was a founder and long time Warden of Trinity Episcopal Church on the Green, and was in charge of New Haven's port inspection and beacon-alarm systems – suggesting that Doolittle provided much of the political and financial leadership in building the Turtle as well as its brass and moving parts.

In making the hull, Bushnell enlisted the services of several skilled artisans, including his brother the farmer Ezra Bushnell and ship's carpenter Phineas Pratt, both, like David Bushnell, from Saybrook. The hull was "constructed of oak, somewhat like a barrel and bound by heavy wrought-iron hoops." The shape of the hull, Gale informed Silas Deane, "has the nearest resemblance to the two upper shells of a Tortoise joined together."

It dived by allowing water into a bilge tank at the bottom of the vessel and ascended by pushing water out through a hand pump. It was propelled vertically and horizontally by hand-cranked and pedal-powered propellers, respectively. It also had  of lead aboard, which could be released in a moment to increase buoyancy.

Six small pieces of thick glass in the top of the submarine provided natural light.  The internal instruments had small pieces of bioluminescent foxfire affixed to the needles to indicate their position in the dark.  During trials in November 1775, Bushnell discovered that this illumination failed when the temperature dropped too low.  Although repeated requests were made to Benjamin Franklin for possible alternatives, none was forthcoming, and Turtle was sidelined for the winter.

Bushnell's basic design included some elements present in earlier experimental submersibles.  The method of raising and lowering the vessel was similar to that developed by Nathaniel Simons in 1729, and the gaskets used to make watertight connections around the connections between the internal and external controls also may have come from Simons, who constructed a submersible based on a 17th-century Italian design by Giovanni Alfonso Borelli.

Preparation for use

One of the central concerns for Bushnell as he planned and constructed the Turtle was funding.

Due to colonial efforts to keep the existence of this potential war asset secret from the British, the colonial records concerning the Turtle are often short and cryptic. Most of the records that do exist concern Bushnell's request for funds. Bushnell met with Jonathan Trumbull, the governor of Connecticut, during 1771 seeking financial support. Trumbull also sent requests to George Washington and Thomas Jefferson. Jefferson, who was an inventor himself, was intrigued by the possibilities while Washington remained skeptical of devoting funds from the Continental Army, whose funding was already being stretched. Ultimately, Washington was able to provide some funds possibly due to Trumbull's influence.

Several setbacks plagued the design process. The mine in particular was delayed several times from its expected completion from 1771 to 1776. Piloting the Turtle, moreover, required great physical stamina and coordination. The operator would have to adjust the bilge in order to keep from sinking while providing his own propulsion by use of a crank, which worked a propeller located on the front of the submarine, and direction by use of a lever that would operate and direct a rudder in the back. The cabin also reportedly held air for only thirty minutes of use. Thereafter, the operator would have to surface and replenish the air through a ventilator. Obviously, training would be needed in order to ensure the project's success due to the complex nature of the machine. "The boat was moved from Ezra's farm on the Westbrook Road to what is now Ayer's Point in Old Saybrook on the Connecticut River," writes historian Lincoln Diamant. Bushnell had a Yale connection here that allowed him to run trials in secrecy. Bushnell did the initial testing of his submarine here, choosing his brother, Ezra, as the pilot. Despite Bushnell's insistence on secrecy surrounding his work, news of it quickly made its way to the British, abetted by a Loyalist spy working for New York Congressman James Duane.

In August 1776, Bushnell asked General Samuel Holden Parsons for volunteers to operate Turtle, because his brother Ezra, who had been its operator during earlier trials at Ayer's Point on the Connecticut river, was taken ill.
Three men were chosen, and the submersible was taken to Long Island Sound for training and further trials.  While these trials went on, the British gained control of western Long Island in the August 27 Battle of Long Island. Since the British now controlled the harbor, Turtle was transported overland from New Rochelle to the Hudson River. After two weeks of training, Turtle was towed to New York, and its new operator, Sgt. Ezra Lee, prepared to attack the flagship of the blockade squadron, .

Destroying this symbol of British naval power by means of a submarine would at least be a blow to British morale and, perhaps, threaten the British blockade and control of New York Harbor. The plan was to have Lee surface just behind Eagles rudder and use a screw to attach an explosive to the ship's hull. Once attached, Lee would re-enter the water and make his getaway.

Attack on Eagle 

At 11:00 pm on September 6, 1776, Sgt. Lee piloted the submersible toward Admiral Richard Howe's flagship, then moored off Governors Island.

On that night, Lee maneuvered the small craft out to the anchorage. It took two hours to reach his destination, as it was hard work manipulating the hand-operated controls and foot pedals to propel the submersible into position. Adding to his difficulties was a fairly strong current and the darkness creeping overhead, which made visibility difficult.

The plan failed. Lee began his mission with only twenty minutes of air, not to mention the complications of operating the craft. The darkness, the speed of the currents, and the added complexities all combined to thwart Lee's plan. Once surfaced, Lee lit the fuse on the explosive and tried multiple times to stab the device into the underside of the ship. Unfortunately, after several attempts Lee was not able to pierce Eagles hull and abandoned the operation as the timer on the explosive was due to go off and he feared getting caught at dawn. A popular story held that he failed due to the copper lining covering the ship's hull. The Royal Navy had recently begun installing copper sheathing on the bottoms of their warships to protect from damage by shipworms and other marine life, however the lining was paper-thin and could not have stopped Lee from drilling through it. Bushnell believed Lee's failure was probably due to an iron plate connected to the ship's rudder hinge.  When Lee attempted another spot in the hull, he was unable to stay beneath the ship, and eventually abandoned the attempt. It seems more likely that he was suffering from fatigue and carbon dioxide inhalation, which made him confused and unable to properly carry out the process of drilling through the Eagles hull. Lee reported British soldiers on Governors Island spotted the submersible and rowed out to investigate.  He then released the charge (which he called a "torpedo", the prevailing term for underwater explosive devices prior to about 1890), "expecting that they would seize that likewise, and thus all would be blown to atoms."  Suspicious of the drifting charge, the British retreated back to the island.  Lee reported that the charge drifted into the East River, where it exploded "with tremendous violence, throwing large columns of water and pieces of wood that composed it high into the air."  It was the first recorded use of a submarine to attack a ship; however, the only records documenting it are American. British records contain no accounts of an attack by a submarine or any reports of explosions on the night of the supposed attack on Eagle.

According to British naval historian Richard Compton-Hall, the problems of achieving neutral buoyancy would have rendered the vertical propeller useless. The route Turtle would have had to take to attack Eagle was slightly across the tidal stream which would, in all probability, have resulted in Lee becoming exhausted.  In the face of these and other problems, Compton-Hall suggests the entire story was fabricated as disinformation and morale-boosting propaganda, and if Lee did carry out an attack it was in a covered rowing boat rather than Turtle.

Despite Turtles failure, Washington called Bushnell "a Man of great Mechanical Powers, fertile of invention and a master in execution." In retrospect, Washington observed in a letter to Thomas Jefferson, "[Bushnell] came to me in 1776 recommended by Governor Trumbull (now dead) and other respectable characters…Although I wanted faith myself, I furnished him with money, and other aids to carry it into execution. He laboured for some time ineffectually and, though the advocates for his scheme continued sanguine, he never did succeed. One accident or another was always intervening. I then thought, and still think, that it was an effort of genius; but that a combination of too many things were requisite…"

Turtles attack on Eagle reflected both the ingenuity of American forces after the fall of New York and the tendency of the weaker belligerent to adopt and embrace new, sometimes radical, technologies. "What astonishment it will produce and what advantages may be made…if it succeeds, [are] more easy for you to conceive than for me to describe," physician Benjamin Gale wrote to Silas Deane less than a year before Turtle'''s mission.

The submarine's ultimate fate is not known, although it is believed that after the British took New York, the Turtle was destroyed to prevent her from falling into enemy hands.

Aftermath

On October 5, Sergeant Lee again went out in an attempt to attach the charge to a frigate anchored off Manhattan.  He reported the ship's watch spotted him, so he abandoned the attempt. The submarine was sunk some days later by the British aboard its tender vessel near Fort Lee, New Jersey.  Bushnell reported salvaging Turtle, but its final fate is unknown.  Washington called the attempt "an effort of genius", but "a combination of too many things was requisite" for such an attempt to succeed.

Following Turtles abortive attack in New York Harbor, Bushnell continued his work in underwater explosives. In 1777, he devised mines to be towed for an attack on HMS Cerberus near New London harbor  and to be floated down the Delaware River in an attempt to interrupt the British fleet off Philadelphia. Both attempts failed, and the latter occupied a brief, if farcical, place in the literature of the war. Francis Hopkinson's poem "Battle of the Kegs," captured the surprising, if futile, venture: "The soldier flew, the sailor too, and, scared almost to death, sir, wore out their shoes to spread the news, and ran till out of breath, sir."

When the Connecticut government refused to fund further underwater project, Bushnell joined the Continental army as a captain-lieutenant of sappers and miners, and served with distinction for several years the Hudson River in New York. After the war, Bushnell drifted into obscurity. He visited France for several years, then moved to Georgia in 1795 under the assumed name of David Bush, where he taught school and practiced medicine. He died largely unknown in Georgia in 1824.  After the war, inventors such as Robert Fulton were influenced by Bushnell's designs in the development of underwater explosives.

Despite Turtle'''s shortcomings, Bushnell's invention marked an important milestone in submarine technology. The American inventor Robert Fulton conceived of his submarine Nautilus in the first years of the nineteenth century and took it to Europe when the United States proved largely uninterested in the design. During the American Civil War, the Confederate States of America, faced with a similar situation to that of the colonies during the War of Independence, developed an operational submarine CSS H.L. Hunley, whose destruction of the USS Housatonic in Charleston Harbor in February 1864 was the first successful submarine attack in history. By the early-twentieth century, the world's navies were beginning to adopt submarines in larger numbers. Like Bushnell's design, these boats mimicked the natural forms of marine animals in their hull designs. As one contemporary historian of submarines observed in 1901, the evolution of modern submarine evolved from the whale, which he deemed a "submarine made by nature out of a mammal."

While Bushnell's name is not generally well-known, he is often credited with revolutionizing naval warfare from below. Bushnell's Turtle created a military vantage point unseen prior to the Revolutionary Wara view from under the war-stricken waters. As historian Alex Roland argues, Bushnell's legacy as an inventor was also burnished by American writers and historians who in the early nineteenth-century lionized Bushnell and his submarine. To a new postwar generation of Americans, he seemed "the ingenious patriot who invented the submarine that terrified the British."  Bushnell joined the ranks of American inventors of the era such as Eli Whitney and Robert Fulton.  These men served as national heroes to Americans who advocated for technological advances and idolized the men making them. "Whether the motives were military pride or scientific nationalism," Roland contends, "it was important to Americans in the first half century after the Revolution to look upon Bushnell's submarine as an American original.

Yet, while the Turtle occupies a prominent place in the history of technology and military history, Roland's scholarship points to other technological precedence that almost certainly influenced Bushnell's design. Roland points to Denis Papin, a French physician, physicist, and member of the Royal Society and the French Academy of Sciences, whose two submarines may well have served as a model for Bushnell. "The submarine Bushnell designed and built... had features peculiar to both of Papin's versions."  As historian of technology Carroll Purcell argues, such trans-Atlantic technology cross-fertilization was hardly exceptional in this era.

Since the Turtles emergence over two centuries ago, the international playing field has leveled. The monopoly over submersible technology once held by the United States was lost over time as other navies around the world modernized and adopted submarine warfare. From the innovations of John Holland in the early twentieth century to the German U-boat campaigns of the World Wars, and the nuclear-powered ICBM submarines of the Cold War, modern navies embraced the submarine, first, for missions of reconnaissance and commerce-raiding, but, increasingly, in offensive, attack roles. In the postwar era, the submarine has become a central component of modern navies. Submarine usage has gone far beyond Bushnell's conception of lifting naval blockades designed to bleed a country dry of their imports to become an essential arm of offensive naval warfare and power projection.

Replicas 
The Turtle was the first submersible vessel used for combat and led to the development of what we know today as the modern submarine, forever changing underwater warfare and the face of naval warfare. As such, the Turtle has been replicated many times to show new audience the roots of submarine technology, how much it has changed, and the influence it has had on modern submarines. By the 1950s, historian of technology Brooke Hindle credited the Turtle as "the greatest of the wartime inventions." The Turtle remains a source of national as well as regional pride, which led to the construction of several replicas, a number of which exist in Bushnell's home state of Connecticut. As Benjamin Gale noted in 1775, the vessel was "constructed with great simplicity," and it has thus inspired at least four replicas. Many of these followed the designs set down by Bushnell, with "precise and comprehensive descriptions of his submarine," which aided the replication process.

The vessel was a source of particular pride in Connecticut. In 1976, a replica of Turtle was designed by Joseph Leary and constructed by Fred Frese as a project marking the United States Bicentennial. It was christened by Connecticut's governor, Ella Grasso, and later tested in the Connecticut River. This replica is owned by the Connecticut River Museum.

In 2002, Rick and Laura Brown, two sculptors from Massachusetts, along with Massachusetts College of Art and Design students and faculty, constructed another replica. The Browns set out to gain a better understanding of human ingenuity while keeping Bushnell's design, materials, and technique authentic. "With it, Yankee ingenuity was born," observed Rick Brown, referring to the latest in a long line of commemoration that perceived the Turtle as something authentically American. Of the temptation to use synthetic and ahistorical materials, Rob Duarte, a MassArts student observed, "It was always a temptation to use silicone to seal the thing. Then you realized that someone else had to figure this out with the same limited resources that we were using. That's just an interesting way to learn. You can't do it any other way than by actually doing it." The outer shell of the replica was hollowed, using controlled fire, from a  Sitka spruce. This replica took twelve days to build and was successfully submerged in water. In 2003, it was tested in an indoor test tank at the United States Naval Academy. Lew Nuckols, a professor of Ocean Engineering at USNA, made ten dives, noting "you feel very isolated from the outside world. If you had any sense of claustrophobia it would not be a very good experience."

In 2003, Roy Manstan, Fred Frese, and the Naval Underwater Warfare Center partnered with students from Old Saybrook High School in Connecticut on a four-year project called The Turtle Project, to construct their own working replica, which they completed and launched in 2007.

On August 3, 2007 three men were stopped by police while escorting and piloting a replica based on the Turtle within 200 feet (61 m) of RMS Queen Mary 2, then docked at the cruise ship terminal in Red Hook, Brooklyn. The replica was created by New York artist Philip "Duke" Riley and two residents of Rhode Island, one of whom claimed to be a descendant of David Bushnell. Riley claimed that he wanted to film himself next to the Queen Mary 2  for his upcoming gallery show. Its portholes and hatch were collected from a marine salvage company. He also installed pumps to allow him to add or remove water for ballast. Riley christened his vessel Acorn, to note the deviation from Bushnell's original design. The vessel, reported the New York Times, "resembled something out of Jules Verne by way of Huck Finn, manned by cast members from 'Jackass.' The Coast Guard issued Riley a citation for having an unsafe vessel, and for violating the security zone around Queen Mary 2. The NYPD also impounded the submarine. Police Commissioner Raymond W. Kelly, calling this an incident of "marine mischief" assured the public that this was simply an art project and did not, in fact, represent a terrorist threat to the passenger ship.

In 2015, the replica built by Manstan and Frese in 2007 for The Turtle Project was acquired by Privateer Media and used in the television series TURN: Washington's Spies.  The submarine was shipped to Richmond, VA where it underwent a full refit and was relaunched for film use in the water.  Additional full-scale interior and exterior models were also made by AMC as part of the production.

Also in 2015, Privateer Media used The Turtle Project replica for the Travel Channel series Follow Your Past, hosted by Alison Stewart.  Filming took place in August where the submarine was launched with a tether in the Connecticut River in the town of Essex, CT.

Footnotes

References

 
 
 
 
 
 
 
 
 
 
 
 
 
 
 Roland, Alex. "Bushnell's Submarine: American Original or European Import."Technology and Culture 18 (April 1977): 157–74.
 Kennedy, Randy. "An Artist and His Sub Surrender in Brooklyn." The New York Times, August 4, 2007.
 Gidwitz, Tom. "The Turtle Dives Again." Archaeology, May/June 2005.
 Darian, Steven, and Amy Price. "David Bushnell: An Inventor Describes His Invention." Technical Communication, vol. 35, no. 4, 1988, p. 344, 
 
 

Submarines of the United States
Ships built in Connecticut
1775 ships
Age of Sail submarines of the United States
Connecticut in the American Revolution
New York (state) in the American Revolution
American Revolutionary War ships of the United States
Shipwrecks of the New York (state) coast
Maritime incidents in 1776
Hand-cranked submarines
1775 in the Thirteen Colonies